St. Peter and St. Paul's Church, commonly known as El-Botroseya and also known as the Petrine Church, is a small Coptic church located in the vicinity of Saint Mark's Coptic Orthodox Cathedral, the seat of the Pope of the Coptic Orthodox Church of Alexandria, in Cairo's Abbassia district. It was built in 1911 over Egyptian prime minister Boutros Ghali's tomb.

History
The church was built in 1911 over the tomb of Boutros Ghali, Egypt's prime minister from 1908 until his assassination in 1910. Its building process was supervised by Ghali's family. His grandson, Boutros Boutros Ghali, sixth Secretary-General of the United Nations and former Egyptian minister of foreign affairs, was also buried in the crypt beneath the altar in February 2016. Originally named Saint Peter and Saint Paul's Church, it became known over the years as the Botroseya Church, the first church to be named after a political family.

On 11 December 2016, a suicide bomber blew himself up at the church, killing up to 25 people, mostly women and children, and injuring many others.

Design
The church is considered by local historians to be of high religious and artistic value. It was designed in the basilica style by Italo-Slovene architect Antonio Lasciac, Khedive Isma'il Pasha's designated chief architect, with 28 meters in length and 17 meters in width. The central nave is separated from the aisles by a row of marbled columns on each side, above which are a series of Italian paintings depicting the life of Jesus, his apostles and a number of saints. At the end of the central aisle is a two-step plate of black marble containing Boutros Ghali's supposed final words. Venetian mosaics can be found on the walls, including one depicting the baptism of Jesus on the Jordan River, and another one behind the sanctuary showing Jesus above a dome, with the Virgin Mary to his right and Mark the Evangelist to his left.

Gallery

References

Churches in Cairo
Coptic Orthodox churches in Cairo
1911 establishments in Egypt
Antonio Lasciac buildings
Churches completed in 1911
Christian organizations established in 1911
20th-century Oriental Orthodox church buildings
20th-century churches in Egypt